George P. Parker (March 27, 1885 – February 17, 1937) was an American politician who served as the Attorney General of Utah from 1929 to 1933.

He died of a heart attack on February 17, 1937, in Long Beach, California at age 51.

References

1885 births
1937 deaths
Utah Attorneys General
Utah Republicans